has been a professor of photography at several institutions in Tokyo, and an instructor at the . He is the eldest son of a farmer and at the age of 24 took up photography after viewing Robert Capa's famous war photos. He published some of the first images of nuclear workers toiling inside a reactor in 1977. Higuchi's photos mainly depict people and situations associated with nuclear issues and he won a Nuclear-Free Future Award.

Higuchi has documented the struggles of radiation victims and, over a half-century, has written 19 books, including The Truth About Nuclear Plants and Erased Victims. Since the 2011 Fukushima I nuclear accidents his work has gained more attention.

See also
Robert Del Tredici

References

External links
 Hōdō shashinshūsei, publisher's description. Includes a chronology of the photographer.

Living people
Japanese photojournalists
Japanese anti–nuclear power activists
Year of birth missing (living people)